Charmaine Cree (born 1952)  is an Australian athlete who won five medals at the 1980 Arnhem Paralympics

Personal
In 1976, when she was 24, Cree had her left leg amputated below the knee due to bone cancer. She has two sons, who were aged seven and nine in 1979. They nicknamed her "The only bionic Mum in Sydney"; they also trained in athletics with her.

Career
A year after her operation, Cree won five medals at the Australian Amputee Sporting Association's New South Wales competition. She then won two gold medals at the 1977 FESPIC Games, and won six gold medals in the Australian Amputee Sporting Association's Queensland championships in 1979. At the 1980 Arnhem Paralympics, she won a gold medal in the Women's High Jump C event, a silver medal in the Women's Long Jump C event, and three bronze medals in the Women's 100 m C, Women's Discus C, and Women's Javelin C events.

Recognition
In 1980, Cree was named the New South Wales Sportswoman of the Year. She received an Australian Sports Medal in 2000.

References

External links
Charmaine Cree – Athletics Australia Results

1952 births
Living people
Paralympic athletes of Australia
Athletes (track and field) at the 1980 Summer Paralympics
Medalists at the 1980 Summer Paralympics
Paralympic gold medalists for Australia
Paralympic silver medalists for Australia
Paralympic bronze medalists for Australia
Paralympic medalists in athletics (track and field)
Sprinters with limb difference
High jumpers with limb difference
Discus throwers with limb difference
Javelin throwers with limb difference
Long jumpers with limb difference
Paralympic sprinters
Paralympic high jumpers
Paralympic javelin throwers
Paralympic discus throwers
Paralympic long jumpers
FESPIC Games competitors
Recipients of the Australian Sports Medal
Australian amputees
Australian female sprinters
Australian female high jumpers
Australian female discus throwers
Australian female javelin throwers
Australian female long jumpers
20th-century Australian women